Kurumulloor is a small village located around 3 miles from Ettumanoor, Kottayam district, Kerala, India. You can reach Kurumullor via neighboring places like Kothanalloor, Neendoor, Kaipuzha and Manjoor South. There are several famous churches and temples located in this village. It is also located 3 miles from Athirumpuzha.
The population consists of Christians and Hindus.

References

Villages in Kottayam district